Michael Sinclair Sanders (born 1939) is a British amateur archaeologist. He is known for having searched for famous biblical sites, such as Sodom and Gomorrah, and famous objects, like the Lost Ark of the Covenant.

References

Further reading
 "Raiders of the faux ark" Boston Globe
 "Finders of the Lost Ark" Maxwell Institute for Religious Scholarship

External links
 Bible Mysteries website (Biography page)
 Ancient Cultures website
 

Amateur archaeologists
British archaeologists
Living people
1939 births